Raquel Sánchez Silva (born 13 January 1973 in Plasencia, Cáceres, Spain) is a Spanish television conductor and writer.

After studying journalism, she started working for a local television in Plasencia. After that, she was a news anchor on Telemadrid and she started working for Canal+ (Noche de los Oscars, La hora wiki) and Cuatro (Soy lo que como, Noche Cuatro, Idénticos, Noche Manga, Oído cocina, a special episode of Supernanny, and special shows about series such as House and Grey’s Anatomy). When Cuatro was merged into the Mediaset España group, she started working in reality shows on Telecinco. In 2015, she was hired by subscription platform Movistar+ to host, beginning in 2016, a daily talk show titled Likes on the platform's new flagship channel #0. In 2017, she was announced as the presenter of Maestros de la Costura, the Spanish version of The Great British Sewing Bee, on TVE. On 29 October 2018, she began hosting the daily talk show Lo siguiente, also on TVE.

TV programs 
Lo siguiente TVE (The Next Thing), (2018-2019)
Maestros de la Costura, TVE (2018–present) (Spanish version of The Great British Sewing Bee)
Likes, (2016-2017)
Gran Hermano VIP, (2015) (Spanish version of Celebrity Big Brother)
Deja sitio para el postre, (2013) 
Expedición Imposible, (2013) (Spanish version of Expedition Impossible)
Perdidos en la ciudad, (2012)-(2013) (Spanish version of The Tribes Are Coming)
Perdidos en la Tribu, (2012) (Spanish version of Ticket To The Tribes)
El Cubo, (2012) (Spanish version of The Cube)
Acorralados, (2011) (Spanish version of The Farm)
Supervivientes, (2011)-(2014)-(2015) (Spanish version of Survivor)
Pekín Express, (2009-2010) (Spanish version of Peking Express)
Sanfermines, (2009)
Visto y Oído (Seen and Heard), (2008)
Ajuste de cuentas (Score Settling), (2008)
S.O.S. Adolescentes, (S.O.S Teenagers), (2007)-(2008)
¡Qué desperdicio! (What a Waste!), (2007)
Soy lo que como (I am what I eat), (2007)
Supernanny, (2006) (Spanish version, special episode)
Oído cocina (Gotcha in the Kitchen), (2006)
Noche Cuatro (Cuatro Night), (2005)
Superhuman, (2005)
La hora wiki (The Wiki Hour), (2004–2005)Telediario, (1998)

Books
 Selección y tratamiento de la información en los telediarios: estudio sobre los telediarios de máxima audiencia de TVE y A3, (1995)
 Cambio príncipe por lobo feroz (I Exchange a Prince for a Bad Wolf), (2008)
 Mañana, a las seis (Tomorrow, at six''), (2014)

Personal life

On 2012 she married the Italian cameraman Mario Biondo, who died after less than a year in suspicious ways. The Italian judiciary investigates the case.
On 2014, Sánchez-Silva has been in a relationship with Argentine audiovisual producer Matías Dumont. Together they have two children: Sánchez-Silva gave birth to twins Bruno and Mateo on 21 September 2015.

References

External links
 Raquel Sánchez-Silva in IMDb
 Página de Cuatro

1973 births
Living people
People from Plasencia
Spanish television presenters
Spanish women television presenters